Wedding in Blood, also known as Red Wedding in the UK is a 1973 French crime drama film directed by Claude Chabrol.  It was entered into the 23rd Berlin International Film Festival.

Plot
In a small French town, filmed in Valençay, the deputy mayor Pierre is having an affair of snatched meetings with Lucienne, the mayor's wife. So that they can be together more often, Pierre poisons his sickly wife without anybody suspecting and Lucienne then starts visiting his house at night. Her husband Paul, aware of what's happening, blackmails Pierre into supporting a dubious land deal. To escape this, the two lovers decide to get rid of Paul, who they kill on a lonely road and set fire to the car. Under orders from Paris, the police treat it as an accident, until they receive a letter from Lucienne's teenage daughter who may have deduced the whole story, but claims she just wants her mother cleared of suspicion. When arrested, the guilty couple do not deny their crimes. Incredulous, the police inspector asks them; "Why didn't you just leave? Go and live somewhere else?" Bemused, they reply; "We never thought of that."

The plot comes from a real event in the little town of Bourganeuf in 1970. René Balaire, a heating engineer, was found burned to death in his car, from which his wife Yvette had escaped unharmed. The police investigation found that he had died from a revolver bullet fired by her lover Bernard Cousty, who had previously killed his own wife.

Cast
 Stéphane Audran as Lucienne Delamare
 Michel Piccoli as Pierre Maury
 Claude Piéplu as Paul Delamare
 Clotilde Joano as Clotilde Maury
 Eliana De Santis as Hélène Chevalier, Lucienne's daughter
 François Robert as Auriol
 Daniel Lecourtois as Prefet / Department governor

References

External links

1973 films
1973 crime drama films
French crime drama films
1970s French-language films
Films directed by Claude Chabrol
Crime films based on actual events
Films à clef
1970s French films